Gijs Bakker (Amersfoort, 20 February 1942) is a Dutch jewellery and industrial-designer, educated at the Gerrit Rietveld Academie in Amsterdam, the Netherlands and the Konstfackskolan in Stockholm, Sweden.

Bakker's designs cover jewellery, home accessories and household appliances, furniture, interiors, public spaces and exhibitions. He worked and works for numerous companies amongst which are  Polaroid, Artifort, HEMA, Royal VKB, and ENO Studio. Bakker is widower of the jewellery designer Emmy van Leersum.
 
In 1993 he founded Droog Design together with design critic and historian Renny Ramakers, a Dutch collective of designers, products and information. Together with Ramakers, he was the selector and art director of all products within Droog Design until 2009. In 2007 he and Renny Ramakers had been awarded the Benno Premsela Prize for their joint effort.
 
Bakker has also taught for more than 40 years at different schools, among others the Delft University of Technology and the Design Academy Eindhoven, where he worked since 1987 until 2012 (since 2000 as Head of the Masters Programme).
 
Together with Italian gallery owner Marijke Vallanzasca, Bakker founded the Chi ha paura...? (Italian for 'who is afraid of') foundation in 1996. With Chi ha paura...? (CHP...?) They wanted to show the international design world that a piece of jewellery is more than a decorative fashion accessory. With this CHP...? challenged the widespread fear for contemporary jewellery.

From 2009 onwards, Bakker has investigated the relation between craft and design in the Netherlands. Abroad, he is active regarding this issue by becoming creative director for Yii Taiwan in 2009. Commissioned by the Taiwanese Craft and Design council, Yii was founded to create a stronger and more sustainable coherence between local Taiwanese craft traditions and contemporary design practice in Taiwan. The brand was also established to develop a more prolific design identity for Taiwan.
 
Gijs Bakker travels around the world to give workshops, lectures and is frequently a member in juries. His retrospective exhibition "Gijs Bakker and Jewelry" (and accompanying monography) was on display in various museums around the world. His work is represented in collections, both in museums and privately, worldwide.

Public Collections
 Centraal Museum, Utrecht
 Collectie Françoise van den Bosch
 Museum Boijmans Van Beuningen, Rotterdam
 Museum voor Moderne Kunst, Arnhem
 Rijksmuseum Amsterdam
 Schmuckmuseum Pforzheim
 Stedelijk Museum Amsterdam
 Stedelijk Museum 's-Hertogenbosch
 Victoria and Albert Museum, London

References

External links 

website Gijs Bakker Design
website Chi ha paura...?
Yii official website

1942 births
Living people
Dutch jewelry designers
People from Amersfoort
Academic staff of the Delft University of Technology